Chahu Golzar (also Romanized as Chāhū Golzār; also known as Chāhū) is a village in Tarom Rural District, in the Central District of Hajjiabad County, Hormozgan Province, Iran. At the 2006 census, its population was 34, in 8 families.

References 

Populated places in Hajjiabad County